

Introduction 

Turritopsis Rubra, commonly referred to as the Crimson Jelly, is a species within the hydrozoan family. The species is native to New Zealand and southern Australia, typically appearing near shorelines in the summer months (December - March). The species follows a distribution pattern across the southern Pacific Ocean and can frequently be found in shallow coastal waters. The bell of the Crimson Jelly is transparent which allows for the bright red stomach and gonads to be visible from the outside. This gives the appearance of a bright red creature in clear water which has deemed the name “Crimson Jelly''. The jellyfish has tentacles attached at the end of the bell margin that can be used for defense and hunting. The tentacles are used to sting and catch prey but are harmless to humans as they are too small to sting larger creatures. The creature is very tiny being less than an inch in size and has the ability to sting but does not produce a poisonous mark. There is little research on the Crimson Jellyfish but it is believed that there is a possibility it shares a very unique characteristic with its closest relative, Turritopsis Dohrnii. More commonly known as the immortal jellyfish, the Turritopsis Dohrnii, is a biologically immortal creature that is able to revert its life cycle to avoid death. Research has not yet confirmed if this talent is possible to be performed by the Crimson Jellyfish but researchers believe it is a possibility. The Turritopsis Genus was noted in the late 1850s but the individual species Turritopsis Rubra was officially phylogenetically traced and identified in 2022 by biologist Andrew Esber at the University of Auckland, New Zealand.

Description 
The entire Turritopsis genus is a very small group of Hydrozoa creatures with the Crimson Jellyfish being on the slightly larger side of the genus. The Crimson Jellyfish ranges in size from just 3 to 7mm depending on what stage of its life cycle the creature is currently in. Being roughly the size of your pinky nail, the creature is like many other jellyfish being very simple with few organs. Underneath its transparent umbrella, the jellyfish has just a stomach, gonads, and a mouth. The bell margin then rounds out the umbrella and is the attachment point for the tentacles. These tentacles serve the purpose of hunting and gathering food because unlike many other species of jellyfish, the Crimson Jellyfish does not have any arms. The Crimson Jelly has approximately 120 tentacles which is significantly more than other members of the Turritopsis genus which range from 80 to 100 tentacles.

Life cycle 
The life cycle for members of the hydrozoa family is extraordinarily unique because it occurs over two different phases. Depending on the current phase of an individual, that individual may be able to reproduce sexually or asexually. The first phase is known as the polyp stage. During this phase, larvae produced by mature jellyfish grow into small stalk-like figures that attach themselves to some kind of surface. These polyps form into an extended branch-like form which is uncommon amongst jellyfish species. The Crimson Jellyfish typically prefers to attach to docks, marinas, vessels, or the ocean floor. Once the polyps find a suitable surface, they will continue to grow until they can asexually reproduce medusae buds. These medusae buds are the

beginning of the second phase in the jellyfish’s life cycle. The buds grow into a fully mature diocious medusae jellyfish which can then utilize sexual reproduction to once again start the life cycle. It is common for maternal medusae to exemplify maternal care towards the larvae that are first produced until they can find a suitable habitat. The mother will carry the larvae at the bell margin, located at the bottom of the bell before the tentacles. They are carried until they are fully developed into polyps and are capable of anchoring onto a surface. After the larvae are ready to detach from the mother, they will travel in colonies until they reach a suitable home. This behavior leads to large swarms of medusae because the polyps will reproduce in the same area and cause many medusae to develop around the same time frame in a suitable environment for them to thrive. A single polyp is capable of producing as many as twelve medusae buds before its part in the life cycle ends.

Distribution 
The Crimson Jellyfish is mainly distributed in the Southeastern Pacific Ocean. This includes Southeastern Australia, Tasmania, and Northern New Zealand. The species is typically visible in shallow coastal water during the summer months between December and March. While the Turritopsis Rubra is limited to the Southeastern pacific, the Turritopsis genus has been distributed all over the world. This distribution is credited towards the polyps ability to latch on to a surface which can include vessels such as large international ships. Because of this global distribution and the prehistoric phylogeny of the Hydrozoa family, researchers are still unsure where the exact origins of the genus may be. It is also extremely rare for jellyfish to fossilize which makes it that much more difficult to track the biogeography of a species. Scientists must find “soft fossils” which occur when a jellyfish is quickly buried under sentiment and preserved since they have no bones that can harden into fossils. These factors have all contributed to the limited knowledge about the Turritopsis genus but researchers believe the origin of the entire genus occurred somewhere in the mediterranean sea due to a speciation event. The genus was first discovered in 1895 but without modern genetic research and DNA testing, the actual species were not distinguishable until the mid 1990s. Up until DNA tests were used, the Crimson Jellyfish, Turritopisis Rubra, was believed to have shared the same unique ability as its close relative, Turripotosis Dohrnii, commonly known as the Immortal Jellyfish. This Jellyfish has the ability to revert its own lifecycle to avoid senescence and theoretically live forever under the right conditions.

Habitat 
The Crimson Jellyfish can be spotted in large swarms in almost any coastal shallow waters in the Southeastern Pacific including large populated areas in temperate or tropical waters. This is especially common during the summer months between December and March because the jellyfish prefers warmer waters in a temperature range of 14 °C – 25 °. Polyps can be commonly found around docks, marinas, vessels, and the ocean floor as long as their preferred pressure range is not exceeded. For both jellyfish in the polyp and medusae stage, a pressure range of 18 - 40 PSU is preferred. The Turritopsis genus prefers similar conditions worldwide and has a slightly larger range of water temperatures that can be tolerated.

Mating & Maternal Care 
Turritopsis Rubra has a similar mating pattern to many other species of jellyfish. At dusk or dawn of each day, large groups of mature medusae gather to mate. The size of each gathering depends on proximity, light, and food abundance and is full of male and female jellies. The more adults can grow during these events, the more offspring they can produce. Because Crimson Jellyfish commonly distribute their polyps in a precise habitat, swarms are common and so is mating. After the group gathers, males release large quantities of sperm and females release unfertilized eggs into the open water. This means that there is typically large amounts of reproductive material within large swarms of these jellyfish. Turritopsis Rubra demonstrates a unique aspect of maternal care when the gathering ends as mothers will pick up any eggs they can and attach them at the base of their umbrellas. These eggs will then form into larvae which stay with the mother until they have matured into polyps and can detach to find a suitable habitat. The polyps then travel in large colonies together and float until they find a suitable surface to attach themselves to.

Diet 
The Crimson Jellyfish’s diet is unique, like many of the Hydrozoa class, because they are omnivores, which is very rare in the animalia kingdom. Only about 3% of the animalia kingdom are omnivores, including humans. The creature consumes both animals and other plants alike as long as the target is small enough to be eaten. Their diet consists of animals such as cretaceous zooplankton, copepods, fish eggs, mollusks, and larvae. The larvae preyed on can include larvae of other jellyfish species as jellyfish are often both prey and predator across species. The Crimson Jelly also consumes small phytoplankton such as Diatom and algae. The size of the jellyfish is its limiting factor when searching for food because the creature is so small. Jellyfish are also extremely simple creatures with very few organs, this leads to efficiency in their daily routines. This is why jellyfish consume food and excrete waste from the same entry point in their bodies. The Crimson Jellyfish uses its mouth to both consume food and excrete waste. The mouth is located directly under the gonads and stomach with no other parts of a digestive tract being needed for this process.

Predation 
Small Jellyfish are often preyed on because of their simple composition. The Crimson Jellyfish is no exception being made up of only 5% matter and 95% water. Without any defense mechanisms towards larger predators and a top speed of only about 8 kilometers per hour, the Crimson Jellyfish is prone to high levels of predation. Predators can differ based on location, but are common regardless of environment. In deeper waters, larger jellyfish and fish such as Tuna, Swordfish, and even some Shark species can hunt large swarms of Crimson Jellies. In shallow coastal waters, predators can range from Seals, to Penguins, and even Sea Turtles. On the Ocean floor, the Turritopsis Rubra faces masses of Sea Anemones which can threaten both medusae and polyps. Although the jellyfish has no defense mechanisms or behavioral patterns to defend itself, the speed of its reproduction abilities keep the Southeastern Pacific well populated.

Genomic Analysis 
The original genus of Turritopsis was thought to have been discovered and charted in 1895 but, without modern DNA sequencing, the individual species were almost impossible to tell apart. Before the mid 1990s, the entire Turritopsis genome was classified as Turritopsis Nutricula including the Turritopsis Dohrnii, or immortal jellyfish. Because of this indistinguishability, the entire genome was assumed to have shared the rare ability to be “biologically immortal” Genomic analysis on the sequencing of mRNA and mitochondria has allowed for the distinction between species and has been used to determine the actual process of “biological immortality.” The Turritopsis Rubra was identified in 2022 by student researcher Andrew Esber at the University of Auckland.

Biological Immortality 
The Immortal Jellyfish, Turritopsis Dohrnii, is currently the only member of the animalia kingdom to display the ability of “biological immortality.” However, it is unknown if other members of the Turritopsis genus have inherited any part of this ability. Researchers do not have any evidence to support the idea that other members may also exhibit this ability. However, with so little research on the rest of the Turritopsis genus, many researchers believe it is possible for members such as the T. Rubra to also demonstrate these abilities. Biological immortality is the ability to revert back from a fully mature adult, medusae, to a juvenile form such as the polyp. The Turritopsis Dohrnii uses cells from its outer umbrella and gonads to reform itself back into a genetically identical polyp. It is currently the only known metazoan that is able to use differentiated cells to reform itself to an earlier stage of its life cycle at will. These cells can then perform transdifferentiation and morph into other types of cells needed to fully create the polyp. This process is also referred to as lineage reprogramming and is extraordinarily rare in the animalia kingdom because it involves skipping the intermediate steps between somatic cell transformation. Because these cells do not need to enter a pluripotent state, this process can occur much more quickly. This speed allows for decisiveness from a mature medusae when deciding to revert back to a polyp form. For example, if the medusae were starving, it could simply revert back to a polyp and survive off of any nutrients floating in the water. This ability allows Turritopsis Dohrnii to avoid old age, starvation, and even predation. This essentially leaves the creature with very little vulnerability to death. Researchers believe the species could have appeared since before the Mesozoic era, around 70 million years ago. It is possible, however unlikely, that one immortal jellyfish may have been alive this entire time. Because of the process of lineage reprogramming leaving no trace of past transdifferentiation, scientists have no way of knowing how long a jellyfish has been alive. Therefore we do not know the age of the oldest member of the species and there is a chance one could be the oldest living organism on earth.

References 
Esber, Andrew. "The Crimson Jellyfish, Turritopsis Rubra", The University of Auckland, Waipapa Tuamata Rau. (2022). 

Devarapalli, Pratap, et al. "The conserved mitochondrial gene distribution in relatives of Turritopsis nutricula, an immortal jellyfish." Bioinformation 10.9 (2014): 586.

Baeza, J. A., de Paiva Barros-Alves, S., Lucena, R. A., Lima, S. F. B., & Alves, D. F. R. (2017). Host-use pattern of the shrimp Periclimenes paivai on the scyphozoan jellyfish Lychnorhiza lucerna: probing for territoriality and inferring its mating system. Helgoland Marine Research, 71(1), 1-10.

Brereton, J. E. (2022). The behavioural biology of invertebrates. In The Behavioural Biology of Zoo Animals (pp. 269-282). CRC Press.

Mokady, O., & Buss, L. W. (1996). Transmission Genetics of Allorecognition in Hydractinia symbiolmgicarpus (Cnidaria: Hydrozoa). Genetics, 143(2), 823-827.

Martell, L., Piraino, S., Gravili, C., & Boero, F. (2016). Life cycle, morphology and medusa ontogenesis of Turritopsis dohrnii (Cnidaria: Hydrozoa). Italian Journal of Zoology, 83(3), 390-399.

World organization of marine species . (2012, September 19). Worms - world register of marine species - turritopsis rubra (farquhar, 1895). Retrieved October 3, 2022, from https://www.marinespecies.org/aphia.php?p=taxdetails&id=284469#sources

Pontin, David R., Sue P. Worner, and Michael J. Watts. "Using time lagged input data to improve prediction of stinging jellyfish occurrence at New Zealand beaches by multi-layer perceptrons." International Conference on Neural Information Processing. Springer, Berlin, Heidelberg, 2008.

Dawson, Michael N. "Cyanea capillata is not a cosmopolitan jellyfish: morphological and molecular evidence for C. annaskala and C. rosea (Scyphozoa: Semaeostomeae: Cyaneidae) in south-eastern Australia." Invertebrate Systematics 19.4 (2005): 361-370.

Diana Macpherson Dennis Gordon with Michelle Kelly & Blayne Herr. “Stunning Seaweeds Beautiful Browns - Niwa.” Jiggling Jellyfish , Inspiration Invertebrates , 2019, https://niwa.co.nz/static/web/MarineIdentificationGuidesandFactSheets/Beautiful_Brown s_Ver1-2016-NIWA.pdf.

AZ Animals Staff. AZ Animals animalia encyclopedia. ``Immortal Jellyfish.” AZ Animals, 13 Sept. 2022, https://a-z-animals.com/ animals/immortal-jellyfish/.

Miglietta, M. P., et al. "Species in the genus Turritopsis (Cnidaria, Hydrozoa): a molecular evaluation." Journal of Zoological Systematics and Evolutionary Research 45.1 (2007): 11-19.

Schuchert, Peter. “Crimson Jellyfish.” Turritopsis Rubra, Wayback Machine, Internet Archive , 12 Sept. 2009, https://web.archive.org/web/20090912180002/http:// www.ville-ge.ch/mhng/hydrozoa/antho/turritopsis-rubra.htm.

Devarapalli, Pratap, et al. "The conserved mitochondrial gene distribution in relatives of Turritopsis nutricula, an immortal jellyfish." Bioinformation 10.9 (2014): 586.

Ma, Hongbao, and Yan Yang. "Turritopsis nutricula." Nature and Science 8.2 (2010): 15-20.

Gershwin, Lisa-ann. Jellyfish: a natural history. University of Chicago Press, 2016.

Yanushevich, Y.G., Shagin, D.A., Fradkov, A.F. et al. Spectral diversity among members of the green fluorescent protein family in hydroid jellyfish (Cnidaria, Hydrozoa). Russ J Bioorg Chem 31, 43–47 (2005). https://doi.org/10.1007/s11171-005-0005-9

Devarapalli, Pratap, et al. "The conserved mitochondrial gene distribution in relatives of Turritopsis nutricula, an immortal jellyfish." Bioinformation 10.9 (2014): 586.

Lisenkova, A. A., et al. "Complete mitochondrial genome and evolutionary analysis of Turritopsis dohrnii, the “immortal” jellyfish with a reversible life-cycle." Molecular phylogenetics and evolution 107 (2017): 232-238.

Matsumoto, Yui. Transdifferentiation in Turritopsis dohrnii (Immortal Jellyfish): Model System for Regeneration, Cellular Plasticity and Aging. Diss. 2017.

Lin, Yi-Chan, Warren J. Gallin, and Andrew N. Spencer. "The anatomy of the nervous system of the hydrozoan jellyfish, Polyorchis penicillatus, as revealed by a monoclonal antibody." Invertebrate Neuroscience 4.2 (2001): 65-75.

Oceaniidae
Animals described in 1895